Ryan Pagente Jimenez (born December 18, 1971) is a Filipino-born prelate of the Roman Catholic Church.  He has been serving as the second bishop of the Diocese of Chalan Kanoa in the Northern Mariana Islands since 2016

Biography

Early life 
Ryan Jimenez was born in Dumaguete, Negros Oriental, Republic of the Philippines on December 18, 1971. He attended high school at Saint Joseph Seminary in Sibulan, Negros Oriental (near Dumaguete). After a teaching interlude, he enrolled at the San Jose Major Seminary on the campus of the Ateneo de Manila University, Loyola Heights, Quezon City, where he studied philosophy. 

From 1995 to 1997, Jimenez taught at a small Catholic school, Eskuelan San Francisco de Borja, on the island of Rota in the Commonwealth of the Northern Mariana Islands.  This solidified his desire to become a priest for the Diocese of Chalan Kanoa, and he went on to the major seminary in Manila.  Jimenez completed his priestly studies with a Master's degree in 2003 at St. Patrick's Seminary in Menlo Park, California. 

On June 8, 2003, Jimenez was ordained to the priesthood for the Diocese of Chalan Kanoa by Bishop Tomas Aguon Camacho on Saipan.

Bishop of Chalan Kanoa 
Pope Francis appointed Jimenez as bishop for the Diocese of Chalan Kanoa on June 24, 2016. On August 14, 2016, he was consecrated as a bishop by Archbishop Savio Tai Fai Hon.

See also

 Catholic Church hierarchy
 Catholic Church in the United States
 Historical list of the Catholic bishops of the United States
 List of Catholic bishops of the United States
 Lists of patriarchs, archbishops, and bishops

References

External links
Roman Catholic Diocese of Chalan Kanoa Official Site

 

1971 births
Living people
People from Dumaguete
Filipino Roman Catholic bishops
21st-century Roman Catholic bishops in Oceania
Roman Catholic bishops of Chalan Kanoa